Radka Urbanová ( Vranková; born 16 March 1973), known by the stage name Radůza, is a Czech award-winning singer and accordionist. She won three awards at the 2003 Anděl Awards. Radůza studied at the Prague Conservatory, from which she graduated in 2001. She had a role in the 2006 film Beauty in Trouble. She gave birth to a son in 2007 and a daughter in 2009.

Discography

Studio albums
2004: Andělové z nebe ("Angels from Heaven")
2004: ...při mně stůj ("...stand by me")
2005: V hoře ("In the Mountains")
2007: V salonu barokních dam ("In the Parlour of the Baroque Dames")
2007: Vše je jedním ("All is One")
2010: Miluju vás ("I Love You All")
2014: Gaia
2015: Marathon — příběh běžce ("Marathon — The Story of a Runner")
2017: Studna v poušti ("The Well in the Desert")
2018: Muž s bílým psem ("A Man with a White Dog")
2020: Kupředu plout ("To Float Onwards")
2022: Nebe je otevřené ("Heaven Is Opened")

Awards and nominations

References

External links

1973 births
Living people
Musicians from Prague
21st-century Czech women singers
Folk-pop singers
21st-century accordionists
Czech accordionists
Women accordionists